Giorgio Audizio (29 April 1911 – 13 June 1978) was an Italian sailor. He competed at the 1948 Summer Olympics and the 1952 Summer Olympics.

References

External links
 

1911 births
1978 deaths
Italian male sailors (sport)
Olympic sailors of Italy
Sailors at the 1948 Summer Olympics – 6 Metre
Sailors at the 1952 Summer Olympics – 5.5 Metre
Sportspeople from Genoa